Not Just a Pretty Face may refer to:
Not Just a Pretty Face (Dustin album), an album by Dustin the Turkey
Not Just a Pretty Face (Rowan Atkinson album), a comedy album by Rowan Atkinson
Not Just a Pretty Face (TV show) A Hong Kong drama released in 2003.